Vivaha Bhojanambu is a 1988 Telugu-language comedy film directed by Jandhyala who co-produced the film with Jaya Krishna under the J. J. Movies banner. It stars Rajendra Prasad, Chandra Mohan, and Ashwini with music composed by S. P. Balasubrahmanyam. The film's title is the song from the 1957 Telugu film Mayabazar. The original song and its video played during the credits. The film was successful at the box office.

Plot
The film begins on Seetarama Rao  a woman hater, runs an organization against them and inflames all men. Once a client, Head Constable Nippu Appalaswamy seeks the reason behind his deeds, then he starts narrating the past. Seetarama Rao & his brother Krishna are raised by his brother-in-law Vasu and sister Subhadra. At that time, he is naïve and everyone makes fun of him. Once, he is quicksand when a beautiful girl Lavanya  surprising, signs in to save. Just after, Seetarama Rao makes various attempts to acquire her love. Being cognizant of it, Lavanya's blackguard cousin Subba Rao  one that aspires to possess her threatens him. Unfortunately, on an awkward occasion, Lavanya slaps Seetarama Rao publicly when he turns red out of shame bids suicide. At that juncture, he receives a letter from Lavanya affirming her true love and that Subba Rao is forcibly coupling up with her. Immediately, he rushes therein, when Lavanya humiliates and necks him out. Thus, Seetarama Rao developed the aversion on women. At present, Vasu Rao & Subhadra arrives and encounters Lavanya when she divulges the reality. Indeed, to protect Seetarama Rao from Subba Rao she forged herself as an imposter. Currently, Lavanya decides to recoup Seetarama Rao's love. So, she makes a play with the help of Vasu Rao & Subhadra by accommodating as Seetarama Rao's neighbor. Soon, she starts an organization against men. During the interval, Krishna is attracted to Lavanya's sister Vasundhara. Eventually, Seetarama Rao's assistant Kailasam (Subhalekha Sudhakar) loves Vasu's dumb sister Jyothi. Here, frightened Krishna elopes with Vasundhara to commit suicide when Appalaswamy rescues them. At last, Seetarama Rao realizes the truth. Finally, the movie ends on a happy note with the marriages of Seetarama Rao & Lavanya, Kailasam & Jyothi, and Krishna & Vasundhara.

Cast

Rajendra Prasad as Seetarama Rao
Ashwini as Lavanya 
Chandra Mohan as Vasu Rao
Suthi Veerabhadra Rao as Lingam
Suthi Velu as Head Constable Nippu Appalaswamy
Brahmanandam as Kavi
Subhalekha Sudhakar as Kailasam
S. P. Balasubrahmanyam as Inspector
Harish as Krishna
Vidya Sagar as Subba Rao
Bhimaraju as Lord Hanuman
Gundu Hanumantha Rao as Constable 111
Ashok Kumar as Priest
Potti Prasad as Simhachalam
Satti Babu as Lecturer
Dham as Thief
Rama Prabha as Durga
Rajyalakshmi as Subhadra
Rajitha as Jyothi
Ratnasagar as Kaveri
Pavala Syamala as Syamala
Haritha as Vasundhara

Production
The film was shot extensively in Visakhapatnam, Andhra Pradesh. Rajendra Prasad appeared as a woman for the first time in this film.

Soundtrack

Music composed by S. P. Balasubrahmanyam. Music released on AVM Audio Company.

Reception
Griddaluri Gopalrao of Zamin Ryot in his review dated 13 May 1988 criticized the film for its lack of novelty, while also adding that the performances of Rajendra Prasad and others were not their best.

References

External links
 

1988 films
1980s Telugu-language films
1988 comedy-drama films
Films directed by Jandhyala
Indian comedy-drama films
Films scored by S. P. Balasubrahmanyam